Frank Birchenough (born 1898) was an English professional footballer who played in the Football League as a goalkeeper for West Ham United and Burnley.  Son of former Manchester United goalkeeper Herbert Birchenough.

Birchenough played non-league football with Nantwich. He played a single Second Division game for West Ham United, against Nottingham Forest on 5 April 1920.

After a spell at Burnley, where he made two appearances as part of the First Division championship-winning squad of 1920–21, he later played for Whitchurch and Rhyl before returning to Nantwich and later kept goal for Sandbach Ramblers during their 1927-28 Cheshire County League campaign.

References

1898 births
Sportspeople from Crewe
English footballers
Association football goalkeepers
Nantwich Town F.C. players
West Ham United F.C. players
Burnley F.C. players
Whitchurch F.C. players
English Football League players
Year of death missing